Preppies is a 1984 comedy written and directed by Chuck Vincent.  The film is ranked Number 45 in GamesRadar's 50 Best Sex Comedies, a list including "Annie Hall" and "The Graduate", and in 2013 Complex magazine rated it Number 42 in their 50 Best Raunchy Teen Comedies, above several better known major studio films.

Premise
Three sexy young women are hired to ensure that three college students don't pass their final exams, which would preclude one of them from inheriting a family fortune.

Cast

Filmed in Manhattan and nearby suburbs, the film has a cast of New York City based actors, several from Broadway with credits ranging from musicals (William Hardy, Peter Brady Reardon), to Shakespeare (Dennis Drake, Leslie Barrett), along with future screenwriter and director Katt Shea, the actress and model Lynda Wiesmeier, and Jerry Butler, an award-winner from earlier Vincent films, showing his versatility here in a comedic role.

 Dennis Drake as Robert 'Chip' Thompson III
 Steven Holt  as Bayard
 Peter Brady Reardon as Marc
 Nitchie Barrett as Roxanne
 Cindy Manion as Jo
 Katie Stelletello as Tip
 Katt Shea as Margot
 Lynda Wiesmeier as Trini
 Jo-Ann Marshall  as Suzy
 Leonard Haas  as Blackwel
 Jerry Butler  as Dick Foster (credited as Paul Sutton)
 Anthony Matteo  as Louie
 Leslie Barrett as Dean Flossmore
 Wayne Franson  as Bikini Dumont
 Myra Chasen  as Corki Dumont
 Lara Berk  as Kiki Dumont 
 Beverly Brown  as Mistress Tayna
 Lynette Sheldon as Saleswoman

Reception
Variety praised the direction and said "The sight gags are often amusing."  The Los Angeles Times called it "silly, crude inept soft core porn." 
More recently a Cashiers du Cinemart overview of Vincent's early R-rated comedies cited their "joyful embracing of sex through a bawdy, burlesque lens" that made them, once they became staples on cable,  the "favorites of teenage boys in the early ’90s everywhere", and specifically praised Preppies for its "very breezy and light" tone.

References

External links

Preppies at Toga Party Podcast

1984 films
American sex comedy films
Teen sex comedy films
1980s English-language films
1980s American films